Elżbieta Benkowska (born 18 August 1988 in Gdańsk, in Poland) is a Polish film director, screenwriter and film editor. Her film Olena competed at the 2013 Cannes Film Festival. It was nominated for Short Film Palme d'Or.

Benkowska studied at the Gdynia Film School.

References

External links

Elżbieta Benkowska at the Filmpolski Database 

Living people
1988 births
Film people from Gdańsk
Polish women film directors
Polish screenwriters
Polish film editors
Women film editors
Polish women screenwriters